Backcoating is the lamination of two sheets of paper back to back to create a superior paper for folding origami models.

Notes and references 

Paper art
Origami